Innovation Nation may refer to:
CBS Dream Team's programmes on the Henry Ford Innovation Nation
The UK Department for Innovation, Universities and Skills' white paper, Innovation Nation (2008)